Branscombe Richmond is an American character actor and stuntman. He is known for his starring role of Bobby Sixkiller on the American syndicated drama series, Renegade (1992–1997), and for his starring roles on the television series, Hawaiian Heat (1984) and Heart of the City (1986–1987). Richmond has appeared in numerous films, and has guest starred on numerous television series.

Life and career

He appeared as a policeman named Harker in the pilot and all 10 episodes of Hawaiian Heat in the fall of 1984 on ABC. The show quickly failed pitted against the ratings juggernaut Dallas. In the fall of 1986, he then appeared as another cop, Sergeant Luke Halui, in all 13 episodes of Heart of the City. It was the second lowest rated show that season, due to having to do battle with NBC's Top 20 hits The Golden Girls and Amen, as well as losing out to CBS's show The New Mike Hammer. It ranked only 78th out of 79 shows and lasted only 13 episodes.

Probably his most well known and prominent television role was in 1990s hit syndicated television series Renegade as Bobby Sixkiller. He also appeared in a minor role as Moki in the pilot episode of Magnum, P.I., before the role was taken over by another actor for the series (he played several bad guy bit parts in later episodes). His many other television appearances include series such as Jake and the Fatman, Vega$, Walker, Texas Ranger, The A-Team and The Highwayman. He has appeared in Star Trek III: The Search for Spock, Action Jackson, Hard to Kill, Journey 2: The Mysterious Island, Aces: Iron Eagle III, Harley Davidson and the Marlboro Man, Christopher Columbus: The Discovery, and in The Scorpion King, as Mathayus's half-brother.

He was inducted to the Motorcycle Hall of Fame in 2003. Grindcore band Anal Cunt  paid tribute to him in a track called "Branscombe Richmond" on their album I Like It When You Die.

He voiced the character Gibraltar in Apex Legends.

He also has his own band, Branscombe Richmond and the Renegade Posse, which he formed in 1989. They tour the US when Branscombe isn't working on television or film, and they also play at corporate functions, most recently at the Thunder Valley Casino in 2010.

Filmography

Film

Television

References

External links

Living people
1955 births
Male actors from Los Angeles
American male film actors
American male television actors